David Porter Chandler (born 1933) is an American historian and academic who is regarded as one of the foremost western scholars of Cambodia's modern history.  Chandler currently resides in Australia, where he is an emeritus professor at Monash University as well as an adjunct professor of Asian Studies at Georgetown University.

Biography

Early life
Chandler was born in the United States in 1933. He has earned degrees from Harvard College; Yale University; and the University of Michigan, where he wrote his dissertation on pre-colonial Cambodia.

Career
Chandler was a United States Foreign Service officer from 1958–66, serving in Phnom Penh (1960–62), Bogotá, Santiago de Cali, and Washington, D.C. He has held professorial positions at Monash University, University of Wisconsin–Madison, Johns Hopkins University, and Cornell University. He has been a Senior Advisor at the Center for Khmer Studies in Siem Reap; a USAID consultant evaluating Cambodia's democracy and governance programs; an Asia Foundation consultant assessing Phnom Penh election activities. He has also accompanied Amnesty International and the Office of the United Nations High Commissioner for Refugees on Cambodian research and fact finding missions, and has been a researcher in Cambodia archives for the U.S. Department of Defense Office of POW/MIA Affairs.

Recognition
A room in the U.S. Embassy in Phnom Penh is named in his honor. In 1994 he was elected a Fellow of the Australian Academy of the Humanities.

Bibliography
A History of Cambodia (1983)
The Tragedy of Cambodian History (1991)
Brother Number One (1992)
Facing the Cambodian Past (1996)
Voices from S-21: Terror and History in Pol Pot's Secret Prison (1999)

References

21st-century American historians
21st-century American male writers
Historians of Southeast Asia
Living people
Harvard College alumni
University of Michigan College of Literature, Science, and the Arts alumni
Academic staff of Monash University
University of Wisconsin–Madison faculty
Johns Hopkins University faculty
Cornell University faculty
1933 births
Yale University alumni
American male non-fiction writers